Abaristophora is a genus of flies in the family Phoridae.

Species
A. arctophila Schmitz, 1927
A. austrophila (Schmitz, 1939)
A. brevicornis (Schmitz, 1939)
A. diversipennis Borgmeier, 1962
A. domicamberae Disney & Ross, 1996
A. nana (Schmitz, 1939)
A. nepalensis Disney & Ross, 1997
A. sachalinensis Mikhailovskaya, 1988
A. similicornis (Schmitz, 1939)
A. subarcuata (Schmitz, 1939)
A. tonnoiri (Schmitz, 1939)

References

Phoridae
Platypezoidea genera